Frank Popoff or Frank Popov (born 1935 in Sofia, Kingdom of Bulgaria) is a Bulgarian American businessman. He has served as the chairman of TCF Financial Corporation since April 2004.

Biography
Born in  Sofia, Bulgaria, on October 27, 1935, Popoff emigrated in 1941 with his father and mother, Eftim and Stoyanka Popoff and his sister Joan to Terre Haute, Indiana. He graduated from Indiana University with an A.B. in chemistry and a Master of Business Administration in 1959. He is a member of Sigma Chi Fraternity. While in graduate school he married Jean Urse, a graduate of the IU College of Education on August 30, 1958. They have three sons, John, Thomas, and Steven and four grandchildren, Maxwell, Hanna, Mia and, Marcus.
Popoff joined The Dow Chemical Company in 1959 and served in technical service and development, sales and marketing positions prior to becoming general manager of the Agricultural Products Department, president of Dow Chemical Europe in Zurich, Switzerland, and returning to Dow's Midland, Michigan, headquarters in 1985  to become chief executive officer and chairman of the board of directors.

Early life
Born in Sofia, Bulgaria, in 1935, he moved with his family to Terre Haute, Indiana, as a six-year-old. In 1941 he attended high school in Terre Haute, and after that he attended college at Indiana University, graduating with an A.B. in chemistry from Indiana University and an MBA from IU's Kelley School of Business.

Career
He was the chief executive officer of The Dow Chemical Company from December 1987 to November 1995, and chairman of the board from December 1992 to November 2000. He was a director of Chemical Financial Corporation from 1989 to 2006 and chairman from 2004 to 2006. He has served as director of American Express Co., Qwest Communications International Inc., United Technologies Corp. and Shin-Etsu Chemical Co. Ltd. and is director emeritus of the Indiana University Foundation. He is also a member of the American Chemical Society and served as a member of The Business Roundtable and the Business Council. He was titled Knight Commander in the Order of Oranje-Nassau by the Netherlands in 1989, received the Leadership Award of the United States Council for International Business in 1992, the Rene Dubos Environmental Award in 1993 and the Palladium Medal in 1994.

References

External links
 Frank Popoff relationship map

American Express people
1935 births
Living people
Dow Chemical Company
Bulgarian emigrants to the United States
20th-century American businesspeople